The Kids from the Marx and Engels Street is a 2014 Montenegrin drama film directed by Nikola Vukčević. It was selected as the Montenegrin entry for the Best Foreign Language Film at the 87th Academy Awards, but was not nominated.

Cast
 Momčilo Otašević as Stanko
 Goran Bogdan as Stanko
 Ana Sofrenović
 Emir Hadžihafizbegović as Potpara
 Branka Stanić
 Filip Đuretić as Vojo
 Anđela Mićanović
 Nebojša Glogovac
 Branimir Popović
 Mladen Vujović

See also
 List of submissions to the 87th Academy Awards for Best Foreign Language Film
 List of Montenegrin submissions for the Academy Award for Best Foreign Language Film

References

External links
 

2014 films
2014 drama films
Montenegrin drama films
Montenegrin-language films
Films set in Montenegro